Gunnar Hansen may refer to:

Gunnar Hansen (1947–2015) was an Icelandic-born American actor and author
Gunnar Hansen (boxer) (1916–2004), Norwegian boxer
Gunnar Hansen (footballer)